St John's GAA is a Gaelic football, hurling and ladies' Gaelic football club in Belfast, County Antrim, Northern Ireland.

St John's GAA have also won awards at junior level as well as senior most recently winning Antrim championships and reaching an All-Ireland final.

Notable people
 Andy McCallin, 1971 Antrim All Star
 John Gough, refereed the 1983 All-Ireland SFC final

Honours
 Ulster Senior Club Football Championship: 1
 1977
 Antrim Senior Football Championship: 24
 1945, 1949, 1951, 1957, 1959, 1960, 1961, 1962, 1963, 1964, 1965, 1969, 1970, 1972, 1975, 1976, 1977, 1978, 1980, 1981, 1984, 1986, 1988, 1998
 Ulster Senior Club Hurling Championship: 1
 1973
 Antrim Senior Hurling Championship: 7
 1934, 1951, 1961, 1962, 1965, 1969, 1973

References

External links
Official site
Facebook page

Gaelic games clubs in County Antrim
Gaelic football clubs in County Antrim
Sports clubs in Belfast